Brett Heyl (born 29 October 1981 in Hanover, New Hampshire) is an American slalom canoeist who competed at the international level from 1998 to 2012. He finished 15th in the K1 event at the 2004 Summer Olympics in Athens.

Heyl is the nephew of singer James Taylor.

World Cup individual podiums

1 Pan American Championship counting for World Cup points
2 Oceania Championship counting for World Cup points

References

1981 births
People from Hanover, New Hampshire
American male canoeists
Canoeists at the 2004 Summer Olympics
Living people
Olympic canoeists of the United States
Sportspeople from Vermont